Childebert was the name of several Frankish kings:

Childebert I, king of Paris (r. 511–558)
Childebert II, king of Austrasia (r. 575–595)
Childebert the Adopted, king of Austrasia, known as Childebert III in France (r. 656–661)
Childebert III, the Just, king of the Franks (r. 695–711), known as Childebert IV in France